CCTA may refer to:

 Central Computer and Telecommunications Agency
Chittenden County Transportation Authority
 Columbia Center for Theatrical Arts
 Coronary CT angiography